This was the 1997-98 Alpenliga season, the seventh season of the multi-national ice hockey league. Nine teams participated in the league, and VEU Feldkirch of Austria won the championship by defeating EC KAC in the final.

Regular season

Playoffs

Group phase

Final 
 Game 1 (4. December 1997), EC KAC – VEU Feldkirch: 3:5 (1:3, 2:0, 0:2)
 Game 2 (6. December 1997), VEU Feldkirch – EC KAC: 4:4 (3:2, 0:2, 1:0)

External links
 1997-98 season

Alpenliga seasons
2
Alpenliga
Alpenliga
Alpenliga